Shabana Basij-Rasikh is an Afghan educator, humanitarian, and women's rights champion. She is the founder of Hela, inc. and School of Leadership, Afghanistan, and has received worldwide recognition for her work.

Early life
Basij-Rasikh was born and raised in Kabul, Afghanistan. She grew up under the rule of the Taliban, forcing her to dress as a boy to attend a secret school, since educating women was forbidden. She is the founder of Sola ( School of leadership Afghanistan) and she has been active for the last 9 years since she was a student at Middlebury college. She recently won the Malala award from the president Ashraf Ghani. Shabana first attended public school after their fall in 2002.

She attended her senior year of high school in Wisconsin, United States as a part of the Kennedy-Lugar Youth Exchange and Study (YES) Program funded by the United States State Department. After graduation, she attended Middlebury College in Vermont, graduating in 2011.

HELA
In 2009, Basij-Rasikh founded HELA, inc, whose mission is to "Empower Afghan Women through Education." The group held fundraisers throughout the North East United States to build a school in a rural area in eastern Afghanistan.

School of Leadership, Afghanistan
While Basij-Rasikh was still in college, she co-founded the School of Leadership, Afghanistan (SOLA), which is "dedicated to giving young Afghans access to quality education abroad and jobs back home.". After graduation, Basij-Rasikh returned to Kabul, and turned SOLA into the first Afghan boarding school for girls. She served as the Acting Head of School for one year, and currently serves as president. Today, it provides an education to girls ages 11–19 across all ethnic backgrounds, and helps them gain admission and financial aid to universities around the world.

Often the girls that graduate from SOLA become the first women to enter their fields, according to the school's website.

Awards and recognition
Basij-Rasikh has been featured extensively since she attended college. In 2010, she was named one of Glamour Magazine's Top Ten College Women. In 2012, she gave a TEDx talk titled "Dare to Educate Afghan Girls". In 2014, she was named an "Emerging Explorer" by National Geographic and joined 10x10 as a Global Ambassador.

References

Afghan educators
Women in Afghanistan
Year of birth missing (living people)
Living people
People from Kabul
Middlebury College alumni